Federal elections were held in Switzerland on 26 October 1890. The Radical Left narrowly retained its majority in the National Council.

Electoral system
The 147 members of the National Council were elected in 52 single- and multi-member constituencies using a three-round voting system of the Exhaustive ballot or a multiple-winner variant thereof. To be elected, in the first or second round a candidate or candidates had to receive a vote from a majority of the voters. If not all the seats were filled in the first or second round, it went to a third round. Again the least-popular candidate was eliminated but now only a plurality was required to determine the winner(s). 

Voters could cast as many votes as there were seats in their constituency. There was one seat for every 20,000 citizens, with seats allocated to cantons based on that ratio.

The elections were held under the new Federal law concerning the elections of National Council members passed on 20 June 1890. Following the 1888 census (which had been brought forward from 1890 in order to redraw the constituencies prior to the elections) the number of seats was increased from 145 to 147, whilst the number of constituencies was increased from 49 to 52; Basel-Stadt, St. Gallen and Zürich all gained one seat, whilst Ticino lost a seat.

Results

National Council 
Voter turnout was highest in Schaffhausen (where voting was compulsory) at 94.3% and lowest in Schwyz at 35.6%.

By constituency

Council of States

References

1890
Switzerland
1890 in Switzerland
October 1890 events